Battle of Vargas Swamp was a battle that occurred near Paipa, on July 25, 1819. A joint Venezuelan and Neogranadine army commanded by Simón Bolívar was trying to prevent Spanish forces from arriving at Santafe de Bogotá, which was lightly defended, before they did. Bolívar's army successfully bested the royalist army in spite of the exhaustion of the troops after climbing the Páramo de Pisba, and crossing the swamp. This battle and the next victory over the Spanish by the Boyacá Bridge secured the independence of New Granada.

Battle 
During the action the left flank of the Patriot army was outflanked and withdrew in disorder. The British Legions played a decisive role in recovering the situation when their commander James Rooke led the 2nd Rifles in a bayonet charge against the Spanish defenses on the hills, gaining the position at great cost. A cavalry attack by a force of Venezuelan Lancers then decided the outcome of the battle, turning defeat into victory.

The battle is commemorated in the Vargas Swamp Lancers memorial.

References

History of Colombia
Spanish American wars of independence
Independence of Colombia
1819 in Colombia
1819 in Venezuela
July 1819 events